The 1898 Buffalo football team represented the University of Buffalo as an independent during the 1898 college football season. The team compiled an 8–1 record and outscored opponents by a total of 214 to 37. Buffalo's coach was Louis Hinkey and played its home games at Olympic Park in Buffalo, New York.

Schedule

References

Buffalo
Buffalo Bulls football seasons
Buffalo football